Robert Hamilton (September 14, 1753 – March 8, 1809) was a businessman, judge and political figure in Upper Canada.

Life

He was born in the manse at Bolton, East Lothian, Scotland in 1753, the son of Rev John Hamilton, the local minister, and his wife Jean Wight. His younger brother George Hamilton served as Moderator of the General Assembly of the Church of Scotland in 1805.

He came to Canada as part of a contract with a fur trading company operating west of the Great Lakes. In 1780, he formed a partnership with Richard Cartwright to supply goods to the British army at Fort Niagara which later expanded to include the transportation of goods across the province. Around 1784, he settled at Queenston. In 1791, with others, he won the contract for transporting military goods through the portage at Niagara. In 1788, he was named to the land board of the Nassau District and a judge of the Court of Common Pleas. He opened a general store at Queenston and also acquired extensive land holding on the Niagara peninsula with his profits.

In 1792, he became a member of the Legislative Council for the province.

He was married twice: first to Catherine Robertson, the daughter of John Askin and Monette a Native American enslaved woman, with whom he had five sons, and secondly to Mary Herkimer, with whom he had three sons and a daughter.  He died at Queenston in 1809.

His sons, Alexander (First Sheriff of Niagara, Postmaster of Upper Canada, Deputy Collector of Customs), Robert, George and John, went on to become important political figures in the province.

References

External links 
Biography at the Dictionary of Canadian Biography Online
Biography for Alexander Hamilton (1790-1839), the son

1753 births
1809 deaths
Members of the Legislative Council of Upper Canada
Pre-Confederation Canadian businesspeople
People from Niagara-on-the-Lake
People from East Lothian
Scottish emigrants to pre-Confederation Ontario
Upper Canada judges
Immigrants to the Province of Quebec (1763–1791)